Xianxingzhe is the first bipedal humanoid robot in China, created in 2000 by the Chinese National University of Defense Technology in Changsha, Hunan. The robot, standing 140 cm tall and weighing 20 kg, walks at a pace of two steps per second.

Development 
China's robotics research began during the 1980s, and their resources at the time were primitive compared to other countries'. Nonetheless, the National University of Defense Technology was determined to make a robot for China, after seeing Japan's and America's robots in the Expo '85 world fair in Tsukuba, Japan. On 31 December 1987, the Chinese robot's legs were successfully programmed. By 1989, the team moved onto the robot's synchronization of the hands, nervous system, and visual sensors, thus steering the project into the direction of making a humanoid robot. On 29 November 2000, the robot was complete, and the team named it "Xianxingzhe", meaning forerunner, as the robot was hailed as a major technological breakthrough in China.

Parody 
Though a significant advance in robotics in China, the robot was also known for the spoof that was made on it.

On 3 March 2001, the Japanese website  posted a page ridiculing the Senkousha (Japanese reading of the Chinese characters for Xianxingzhe) in response to the Chinese enthusiasm.

Later, in a separate article, the site "revealed" that the Senkousha was actually a military weapon, and elaborated on the protruding joint on the robot's crotch. According to the page, the Senkousha would first rattle the ground with its feet to stir the energy resting on the ground, then it will do squats to harness that energy and transfer them to its crotch cannon, then finally fire that energy in a massive white beam with a pelvic thrust. In conclusion, the author of the article expressed his worries about world peace, seeing the destructive power that the robot possesses (including the ability to make people die laughing).

With the article, Samurai Damashii exceeded 10,000 pageviews per day, which is rare in personal webpages. It was said that a peak level of 200,000 pageviews per day was recorded. (In Japan, in the past, a personal webpage with 1,000 pageviews per day was considered successful . Now, because of Senkousha, that standard has risen to 10,000.  ) The articles officially started the Senkousha craze in Japan, and later Taiwan.

Influence 
The Senkousha craze quickly spread into Japanese internet forums like 2channel, achieving meme stature. Using the plot from the games, fans even wrote a theme song for Senkousha, and subsequently used the song to make a fake tokusatsu opening animation, spreading the meme even further.

Other appearances include:
 Netrunner, a Japanese magazine, quick to respond to internet culture, made models of the Senkousha for sale. The magazine also featured Senkousha in its anime OVA, Netrun-mon.
 Hyper Octagon Station, a dōjin circle, created a 3D Senkousha online game, with robots dueling each other in the Yokohama Chinatown.
 The robot is depicted in the anime Puni Puni Poemy dancing past the Aasu's house.
 In the anime and manga Yakitate!! Japan, Azuma and Kawachi thought of a robot that looked similar to the Senkousha when told that they are only bread-making machines.
 In episode 14 of Ghost in the Shell: Stand Alone Complex, there is an android related to the Chinese mafia named Pioneer which has a cannon protruding out of its groin area.
 In the first episode of Negima!?, a model of Senkousha is seen standing on Chao Lingshen's desk.
 In the twenty-third episode of Rizelmine, Lan-lan, the artificial human from China is seen riding on top of a robot who looks like Senkousha during the chase scene.
 Norikuni Iwata from Excel Saga received a Senkousha figurine from his co-worker, Daimaru Sumiyoshi, out of pity in Volume Eight of the manga. It appears on pages 76 and 83 of both the Japanese and American version.
 A modification called Parallel Worlds for Battlefield 1942 features the Senkousha as an operable vehicle, complete with crotch mounted cannon.
 In episode 3 of R-15, there is a robot with a crotch drill in one of Takuto's day dreams.

References 
  Xinhua News Agency.  The forerunner advances to a new century People's Daily. November 30, 2000. URL accessed September 1, 2007. 
  Article by Samurai Damasii 
  Second article by Samurai Damasii
  Senkousha game 1, Senkousha game 2 
  The fan-made tokusatsu opening animation
  "Senkousha as a plastic model? (「先行者」がプラモに？)". ITMedia. 2002-05-29.

External links 
 National University of Defense Technology 

Internet memes
Robots of China
Bipedal humanoid robots
Historical robots
2000 robots